Sailly-en-Ostrevent is a commune in the Pas-de-Calais department in the Hauts-de-France region of France.

Geography

Population

Places of interest
 The church of St. Albin, rebuilt along with much of the village after World War I.
 The cromlech of Les Bonnettes. In the fields of the commune stands a mound about five metres high, on which are erected five (there were once seven) large stones (dolmen or menhir). The last excavations took place in 1887 but no clues or evidence was discovered as to the origins of the monument.

See also
Communes of the Pas-de-Calais department

References

Saillyenostrevent